Adrian Capes (18 April 1873 – 29 September 1955), was an English footballer. A forward, he scored a total of 135 goals in 340 league and FA Cup games in a 17-year career with Nottingham Forest, Burton Wanderers, Burton Swifts, Burslem Port Vale, and Stoke. He also played cricket for Staffordshire in the 1900 Minor Counties Cricket Championship. After retiring in 1911, he worked behind the scenes at Port Vale from 1911 to 1934. His brother, Arthur, was also a professional footballer.

Career
Capes was born in Burton upon Trent and began his career at Second Division club Burton Wanderers, along with his brother Arthur. He and his brother formed a formidable partnership in two seasons with Burton, scoring 66 goals between them. Their efforts helped to bring the club to within four points of champions Liverpool in 1895–96.

This brought the attention of bigger clubs and they both signed for First Division side Nottingham Forest in August 1896. Only Arthur made any impact at the club, whilst Adrian fell out of the first team picture. He scored seven goals in 29 top-flight games in 1896–97, before returning to his hometown the next season with Burton Swifts, back in the Second Division. He made little impact for the Swifts, and featured just once in the 1898–99 season.

Capes signed with Burslem Port Vale in November 1900. He scored 11 goals in 25 matches in the 1900–01 season, ending as the club's top-scorer. He played every league game in the 1901–02 campaign, claiming 14 league and three FA Cup goals. He missed just the one league game in the 1902–03 season, claiming 18 goals throughout the campaign. He bagged two hat-tricks: in a 4–0 win over Stockport County at Edgeley Park on 13 December, and in a 5–1 win over Lincoln City at the Athletic Ground on 24 January. Capes scored 17 goals in the 1903–04 campaign, to finish as the club's top-scorer for the fourth season in a row. However, he found the net just four times in his 30 league games in the 1904–05 season, as the Vale struggled in front of goal. He opened the 1905–06 season with just two goals (both against Chesterfield) in 12 league games, and was transferred to nearby Stoke in November 1905, after receiving a recommendation from his brother who had a good two-year spell at the Victoria Ground.

Capes played six First Division matches for Stoke without scoring in the 1905–06 season. He played 13 matches in the 1906–07 campaign, and claimed goals against Everton and Notts County, but left in February 1907 with Stoke heading towards relegation.

After almost two years out of the game, he rejoined phoenix club Port Vale, who were competing in the North Staffordshire & District League, in December 1908. He suffered a knee injury in March 1910 and never really recovered, retiring in the summer of 1911. He had scored 15 goals in 33 league games in his second spell at the club, and won the Staffordshire Junior Cup in 1910. Upon his retirement from playing, Capes served Port Vale as a trainer from 1911 to 1919, and remained in the Vale back-room team until his full retirement in May 1934.

Family
His younger brother, Arthur, won the FA Cup in 1898 with Nottingham Forest, and also played for Stoke, as well as playing once for England in 1903.

Career statistics
Source:

Honours
Port Vale
Staffordshire Junior Cup: 1910

References

1873 births
1955 deaths
Sportspeople from Burton upon Trent
English footballers
Association football forwards
Burton Wanderers F.C. players
Nottingham Forest F.C. players
Burton Swifts F.C. players
Port Vale F.C. players
Stoke City F.C. players
English Football League players
English cricketers
Staffordshire cricketers
Association football coaches
Port Vale F.C. non-playing staff